José Augusto Buoro Moscatto (born 11 November 1972), is a Brazilian retired professional footballer who played as a goalkeeper.

His greatest achievement as a football athlete was the fact that he scored the first goalkeeper goal in the history of São Paulo FC, about 1 years before Rogério Ceni, the world recordist goalscoring goalkeeper, has scored his first goal for the club.

See also 

1995 São Paulo FC season
Torneio Rei Dadá
List of goals scored by Rogério Ceni
List of goalscoring goalkeepers

References

1972 births
Living people
Association football goalkeepers
Brazilian footballers
São Paulo FC players
Footballers from São Paulo (state)
People from Jaú